Beverly Hills Cop is a 1984 American buddy cop action comedy film directed by Martin Brest, screenplay by Daniel Petrie Jr., story by Danilo Bach and Daniel Petrie Jr., and starring Eddie Murphy as Axel Foley, a street-smart Detroit cop who visits Beverly Hills, California to solve the murder of his best friend. Judge Reinhold, John Ashton, Ronny Cox, Lisa Eilbacher, Steven Berkoff, Paul Reiser, and Jonathan Banks appear in supporting roles.

This first film in the Beverly Hills Cop franchise shot Murphy to international stardom, won the People's Choice Award for "Favorite Motion Picture" and was nominated for both the Golden Globe Award for Best Motion Picture – Musical or Comedy and Academy Award for Best Original Screenplay in 1985. It was an immediate blockbuster, receiving critical acclaim and earning $234 million at the North American domestic box office, making it the highest-grossing film released in 1984 in the U.S.

Plot
Young and reckless Detroit Police Department detective Axel Foley's latest unauthorized sting operation goes sour when two uniformed officers intervene, resulting in a high-speed chase through the city that causes widespread damage. His superior, Inspector Douglas Todd, reprimands Axel for his behavior and threatens to fire him unless he changes his ways on the force. Axel arrives at his apartment to find it has been broken into by his childhood friend, Michael (Mikey) Tandino. When they were kids, Mikey and Axel committed grand theft auto together, and Mikey took the rap for it and served time in prison.  He ended up working as a security guard in Beverly Hills thanks to a mutual childhood friend, Jenny Summers. Mikey shows Axel some German bearer bonds and Axel wonders how he got them, but chooses not to question him about it. After hanging out at a bar, they return to Axel's apartment where two men, Zack and Casey, knock Axel unconscious, confront Mikey about the bearer bonds and then kill him.

Axel asks to investigate Mikey's murder, but Inspector Todd refuses to allow it because of his close ties to Mikey. Axel uses the guise of taking vacation time to head to Beverly Hills to solve the crime alone. He finds Jenny working in an art gallery and learns about Mikey's ties to Victor Maitland, the gallery's owner. Posing as a flower deliveryman, Axel goes to Maitland's office and tries to question him about Mikey, but is thrown out a window by Maitland's bodyguards and arrested. At the police station, Lieutenant Andrew Bogomil assigns Sergeant John Taggart and Detective Billy Rosewood to follow Axel. Taggart and Billy have a humiliating encounter with Axel when he sabotages their car. As a result, Billy and Taggart do not get along with Axel at first, but the three do begin to develop a mutual respect after they foil a robbery at a striptease bar.

On the trail of Mikey's killers, Axel sneaks into one of Maitland's warehouses, where he finds crates full of coffee grounds, which he suspects were used to pack drugs while covering their scent from police dogs. He also discovers that many of Maitland's crates have not gone through customs. After being arrested again, this time after a battle with Zack at Maitland's country club, Axel admits to Bogomil that Maitland must be a smuggler. Police Chief Hubbard, who has learned of Axel's ill-advised investigative actions, orders that Axel be escorted out of town. However, Axel convinces Billy to pick up Jenny instead and take her with them to the warehouse, where a shipment is due to arrive that day.

Axel and Jenny break into the warehouse and discover several bags of cocaine inside a crate. Before Axel can get this newfound evidence to Billy, Maitland and his associates arrive. Maitland takes Jenny and leaves Axel to be killed, but after Zack admits to Axel he was the one who killed Mikey. After some hesitation, Billy enters the warehouse and rescues Axel during a brief gunfight in which he kills Casey. Taggart tracks Axel and Billy to Maitland's estate, where he joins the two in their efforts to rescue Jenny and bring Maitland to justice. Together, the trio wipe out a number of Maitland's men, including Zack. With Bogomil's help, Axel then fatally shoots Maitland and rescues Jenny. Bogomil fabricates a story to Hubbard that covers for all the participants without discrediting the Beverly Hills PD. Realizing that his exploits while "on vacation" are likely to get him thrown off the Detroit police force, Axel requests that Bogomil straighten matters over with Inspector Todd; when Axel mentions the possibility of setting up shop as a PI in Beverly Hills, Bogomil nervously agrees to wipe the slate clean for him. Later, Taggart and Billy meet Axel as he checks out of his hotel, and pay his bill. Axel invites them to join him for a farewell drink, and they accept the offer.

Cast

Production

Development and writing

In 1977, Paramount executive Don Simpson came up with a movie idea about a cop from East L.A. who transferred to Beverly Hills. Screenwriter Danilo Bach was called in to write the screenplay. Bach pitched his idea to Simpson and Paramount in 1981 under the name Beverly Drive, about a cop from Pittsburgh named Elly Axel. However, his script was a straight action film and Bach was forced to make changes to the script, but after a few attempts the project went stale. With the success of Flashdance (1983), Simpson saw the Beverly Hills film as his next big project. Daniel Petrie, Jr. was brought in to rewrite the script and Paramount loved Petrie's humorous approach to the project, with the lead character now called Axel Elly, from Detroit. Producer Jerry Bruckheimer claimed that the role of Axel Foley was first offered to Mickey Rourke, who signed a $400,000 holding contract to do the film. When revisions and other preparations took longer than expected, Rourke left the project to do another film. Martin Scorsese was offered to direct the film but turned it down as he felt that the film's concept was too similar to Coogan's Bluff. David Cronenberg was also offered to direct the film but also turned it down.

Sylvester Stallone was originally considered for the part of Foley. Stallone gave the script a dramatic rewrite and made it into a straight action film. In one of the previous drafts written for Stallone, the character of Billy Rosewood was called "Siddons" and was killed off half-way through the script during one of the action scenes. Stallone had renamed the lead character to Axel Cobretti, with the character of Michael Tandino being his brother and Jenny Summers playing his love interest. Stallone has said that his script for Beverly Hills Cop would have "looked like the opening scene from Saving Private Ryan on the beaches of Normandy. Believe it or not, the finale was me in a stolen Lamborghini playing chicken with an oncoming freight train being driven by the ultra-slimy bad guy." However, Stallone's ideas were deemed "too expensive" for Paramount to produce and Stallone ultimately pulled out two weeks before filming was to start. Stallone would later use the bulk of these ideas as the basis for the 1986 film Cobra. Two days later, the film's producers, Simpson and Bruckheimer, convinced Eddie Murphy to replace Stallone in the film, prompting more rewrites. Besides Stallone and Rourke, other actors who were considered for the role of Axel Foley included Richard Pryor, Al Pacino, and James Caan. Harrison Ford was offered the role of Axel Foley but turned it down.

The film was budgeted at $14 million, including $4 million for Murphy, but was brought in at a cost of just $13 million.

Music

Soundtrack

The soundtrack was released on MCA Records and won the Grammy Award for Best Score Soundtrack for Visual Media (1986). The instrumental title tune, "Axel F", composed and performed by Harold Faltermeyer, has been covered by numerous artists.  The soundtrack also featured the song "Neutron Dance," performed by the Pointer Sisters, which became a Billboard Top 10 hit, and two Patti LaBelle hits, "New Attitude," which hit the top twenty on the US Billboard Hot 100, and the Grammy Award-winning "Stir It Up."

Reception

Box office
Beverly Hills Cop was released on December 5, 1984, in 1,532 theaters. It debuted in first place at the US box office, making $15,214,805 in its first five days of release. It expanded on December 21 into 2,006 theatres. The film stayed at number one for 13 consecutive weeks and returned to number one in its 15th weekend making 14 non-consecutive weeks at number one tying Tootsie for the film with the most weeks at number one. The film earned $234,760,478 in the United States, being the highest-grossing film released in 1984. Adjusted for inflation, it is the third highest-grossing R-rated film of all-time behind The Exorcist and The Godfather. For nearly two decades, Beverly Hills Cop would hold the record for having the highest domestic gross for an R-rated film until 2003 when it was taken by The Matrix Reloaded. Box Office Mojo estimates that the film sold over 67 million tickets in the US.

Critical response
Beverly Hills Cop received critical acclaim upon its release. Janet Maslin of The New York Times wrote "Beverly Hills Cop finds Eddie Murphy doing what he does best: playing the shrewdest, hippest, fastest-talking underdog in a rich man's world. Eddie Murphy knows exactly what he's doing, and he wins at every turn." Richard Schickel of Time magazine wrote that "Eddie Murphy exuded the kind of cheeky, cocky charm that has been missing from the screen since Cagney was a pup, snarling his way out of the ghetto."  Axel Foley became Murphy's signature role and was ranked  78 on Empire magazine's list of The 100 Greatest Movie Characters of All Time. Also, Entertainment Weekly magazine ranked Beverly Hills Cop as the third best comedy film of the last 25 years. According to Christopher Hitchens, the British novelist and poet Kingsley Amis considered the film "a flawless masterpiece."

John Simon of National Review called Beverly Hills Cop "a truly contemptible film."

Review aggregation website Rotten Tomatoes retrospectively collected reviews from 53 critics to give the film a score of 83%, with an average score of 7.3/10. The site's consensus reads, "The buddy cop movie continues its evolution unabated with this Eddie Murphy vehicle that's fast, furious, and funny." In 2003, the film was picked by The New York Times as one of the 1000 Best Movies Ever Made.

Accolades

 This film is  22 on Bravo's list of the 100 funniest films.

American Film Institute Lists
 AFI's 100 Years... 100 Movies - Nominated
 AFI's 100 Years... 100 Laughs - #63
 AFI's 100 Years... 100 Heroes and Villains:
 Detective Axel Foley - Nominated Hero

Sequels
The film spawned a film series with two sequels, Beverly Hills Cop II and Beverly Hills Cop III, both starring Eddie Murphy, in 1987 and 1994, respectively. Judge Reinhold reprised his role for the sequels. The second film met with mixed reviews but was a box office success, while the third film was unsuccessful both critically and commercially.

In 2013, a television series was reported to be in the works for CBS. The pilot was written by Shawn Ryan and directed by Barry Sonnenfeld. Brandon T. Jackson was cast as Axel Foley's son. The series was not picked up, but Ryan reported that it tested well enough for Paramount to put a fourth film into production.

On November 14, 2019, Deadline Hollywood announced that Paramount Pictures made a one-time license deal with an option for a sequel to Netflix to create the fourth film. In April 2022, Mark Molloy was announced as the film's director, while Will Beall penned the script.

References

External links

 
 
 
 
 
 
 

 
1984 films
1980s English-language films
1980s action comedy films
1980s buddy comedy films
1980s buddy cop films
1980s police comedy films
American action comedy-drama films
American buddy comedy films
American buddy cop films
Fictional portrayals of the Detroit Police Department
Films about murder
Films directed by Martin Brest
Films produced by Don Simpson
Films produced by Jerry Bruckheimer
Films scored by Harold Faltermeyer
Films set in Beverly Hills, California
Films set in Detroit
Films set in Los Angeles
Films shot in Detroit
Films shot in Los Angeles
Paramount Pictures films
Films with screenplays by Daniel Petrie Jr.
1984 comedy films
1984 drama films
1980s American films